Hugh of Ibelin (c. 1213–1238), called the Strong, was the third of five sons of John I of Beirut. He and his elder brother Balian were hostages at the court of Frederick II, Holy Roman Emperor, in 1228–1229. He led the first battaile at the Battle of Agridi in 1232 and thus withstood the brunt of the enemy charge. He was dead by 1238. In April 1239, Henry I of Cyprus had a mass said in his name at Nicosia.

Footnotes

References
Marshall, Christopher. Warfare in the Latin East, 1192–1291. Cambridge University Press, 1992.

Christians of the Fifth Crusade
1238 deaths
Hugh
Year of birth uncertain